Giuseppe Varni (born Józef Bruno Winawer) (1902-1965) was a Polish-born Italian stage and film actor.

Selected filmography

 Oltre l'amore (1940) - Il commissario
 Amami Alfredo (1940) - (uncredited)
 Eternal Melodies (1940) - Un detrattore
 Maddalena, Zero for Conduct (1940) - Amilcare Bondani, il bidello
 L'orizzonte dipinto (1941) - Un pagliaccio
 The Secret Lover (1941) - Il portiere dell'albergo
 First Love (1941) - L'editore Wolkoff
 The Two Orphans (1942) - Picard, il cameriere
 La signorina (1942)
 Luisa Sanfelice (1942)
 The Woman of Sin (1942)
 Odessa in Flames (1942) - Lo scrivone
 Harlem (1943) - Un gangster
 La danza del fuoco (1943)
 Sad Loves (1943) - Il cavaliere Rublo
 Sogno d'amore (1943)
 Finalmente sì (1944)
 Rigoletto (1946) - Count of Ceprano
 Eugenia Grandet (1946) - Mr. Des Grassins
 Before Him All Rome Trembled (1946) - Stagehand
 Biraghin (1946)
 La grande strada (1947)
 Fire Over the Sea (1947) - Matteo La Spina
 Black Magic (1949) - Boehmer
 The Force of Destiny (1950) - Il pellegrino caritatevole
 Night Taxi (1950) - Maggiordomo
 La grande rinuncia (1951)
 Quo Vadis (1951) - Hairdresser (uncredited)
 Messalina (1951) - Pallante
 We're Dancing on the Rainbow (1952) - Bachmeier
 La colpa di una madre (1952)
 House of Ricordi (1954) - Monti
 Don Camillo's Last Round (1955) - Un démocrate-chrétien (uncredited) (final film role)

References

Bibliography
 Anile, Alberto. Orson Welles in Italy. Indiana University Press, 2013.

External links

1902 births
1965 deaths
Italian male film actors
Polish emigrants to Italy